France competed at the 2013 World Games held in Cali, Colombia.

Medalists

Archery 

Jean-Charles Valladont won the gold medal in the men's field recurve event and Pierre-Julien Deloche won the silver medal in the men's compound event.

Karate 

In total two gold medals and two silver medals were won by French karateka.

Sandy Scordo won the gold medal in the women's kata event and Lucie Ignace won the gold medal in the women's kumite 55 kg event.

Alexandra Recchia won the silver medal in the women's kumite 50 kg event and Nadège Aït-Ibrahim won the silver medal in the women's kumite +68 kg event.

References 

Nations at the 2013 World Games
2013 in French sport
2013